Portland is an unincorporated community in Sumner County, Kansas, United States. It is located about 5 miles northeast of South Haven at 1.5 miles north of the intersection of S Hydraulic Rd and U.S. Route 166, next to an abandoned railroad.

History
A post office was opened in Portland in 1886, and remained in operation until it was discontinued in 1940.

The Kansas Southwestern Railway previously passed through the community, east to west, from Geuda Springs to South Haven.

Education
The community is served by South Haven USD 509 public school district.

References

Further reading

External links
 Sumner County map, KDOT

Unincorporated communities in Sumner County, Kansas
Unincorporated communities in Kansas